Biometrical Journal covers statistical methods and their applications in life sciences including medicine, environmental sciences and agriculture. Typical articles contain both, the development of methodology and its application. At present, articles are accompanied on the publisher's web site by computer code and illustrative data sets for the sake of reproducible research. The code is checked by an appointed Reproducible Research Editor before it is published as supplementary material.

It is published by Wiley-VCH in cooperation with the German and Austro-Swiss Regions of the International Biometric Society (IBS) electronically and in print using the English language.

History 
Ten years after the foundation of the Federal Republic of Germany (FRG) and the German Democratic Republic (GDR), Ottokar Heinisch (Leipzig, GDR) and Maria-Pia Geppert (Bad Nauheim, FRG) jointly started to publish the journal in Akademie Verlag in 1959 under the title Biometrische Zeitschrift, as the scientific journal of the IBS' German Region, which had been meeting annually since 1953. Twelve years after the Berlin wall had been built and under pressure from GDR authorities, a separate Region GDR was established to cut off the contacts with the FRG. The journal adopted its English title Biometrical Journal in 1976, when  (Berlin, GDR) was its editor. Both IBS Regions reunited soon after German reunification.

Editors of Biometrical Journal
 1959 - 1966 	Ottokar Heinisch and Maria-Pia Geppert  
 1966 - 1968 	Maria-Pia Geppert  and 
 1968 - 1988 	
 1989 - 1995 	Heinz Ahrens and Klaus Bellmann  
 1996 - 1999 	
 2000 - 2003 	Peter Bauer
 2004 - 2008 	 and Martin Schumacher
 2009 - 2011 	Tim Friede and Leonard Held
 2012 - 2014 	Lutz Edler and Mauro Gasparini
 2015 - 2017   Dankmar Böhning and Marco Alfò
 2020 - 2022   Matthias Schmid and Arne Bathke

Abstracting and indexing 
The Biometrical Journal figured in the 2007 comparison of statistics journals, according to which it is indexed in the Current Index to Statistics, Zentralblatt MATH, and Medline. Its impact factor was close to the median of indexed journals. The journal home page additionally lists CompuMath Citation Index, EORTC Bibliography Database, Mathematical Reviews, SCOPUS, VINITI, Web of Science, and Zoological Record among others.

References

External links 

 
 Journal page at publisher's website
 German Region of the International Biometric Society
 Austro-Swiss Region of the International Biometric Society
 International Biometric Society

Biostatistics journals
Publications established in 1959
English-language journals
Bimonthly journals
Wiley-VCH academic journals